The Northern Humanitarian Operations Medal was a Sri Lankan campaign medal for action during Eelam War IV, presented to:
 The Minister of Defence, the deputy Minister of Defence, the Defence Secretary, Service Commanders and the Inspector General of Police, by virtue of their appointments,
 All service personnel on active service during the period covering 26 February 2007 – 18 May 2009 and had been formally recommended by their service commanders,
 All police personnel who served in the Eastern theater of operations during the specified period and formally recommended by the Inspector General of Police,
 Civilians employed by the armed services who served in the Eastern theater during the specified period and formally recommended by the relevant authority, and
 Civilian medical staff employed by the armed services who were physically present in the Eastern theater for a minimum period of seven days during the specified period and had been formally recommended by the relevant authority.

A clasp was awarded to:
The Minister of Defence, the Deputy Minister of Defence, the Defence Secretary, Service Commanders and the Inspector General of Police, by virtue of their appointments,
All service personnel that took part in combat, fire support, logistics, medical services, planning, direction or other related activities during the military actions in the Eastern theater for a minimum of 90 days during the period specified. The 90-day minimum was waived for Army, Navy and Air Force personnel that sustained casualties during the 90-day period, and
Air Force and Navy personnel not physically present in the Eastern theater (restricted to combat or logistics-related activities, with a service period decided on by their service commanders).

The clasp is denoted by a silver color disk on the ribbon bar.

References

Sri Lankan military awards and decorations

External links
Sri Lanka Army
Sri Lanka Navy
Sri Lanka Air Force
Sri Lanka Police
Ministry of Defence : Sri Lanka

Sri Lankan campaign medals